The women's 400 metres hurdles event at the 2009 Asian Athletics Championships was held at the Guangdong Olympic Stadium on November 13.

Results

References
Final results

2009 Asian Athletics Championships
400 metres hurdles at the Asian Athletics Championships
2009 in women's athletics